The 2013–14 Idaho State Bengals men's basketball team represented Idaho State University during the 2013–14 NCAA Division I men's basketball season. The Bengals, led by second year head coach Bill Evans, played their home games at Reed Gym and were members of the Big Sky Conference. They finished the season 11–18, 8–12 in Big Sky play to finish in tenth place. They failed to qualify for the Big Sky Conference tournament.

Roster

Schedule

|-
!colspan=9 style="background:#000000; color:#FF8300;"| Exhibition

|-
!colspan=9 style="background:#000000; color:#FF8300;"| Regular season

References

Idaho State Bengals men's basketball seasons
Idaho State
IIdaho
IIdaho